Alexandra Dimoglou (born 15 December 1981) is a Greek Paralympic track and field athlete competing mainly in category T13 sprint events.

She competed in the 2008 Summer Paralympics in Beijing, China. There, she won a silver medal in the women's 400 metres - T13 event, a bronze medal in the women's 100 metres - T13 event and a bronze medal in the women's 200 metres - T13 event.

References
 

Paralympic athletes of Greece
Athletes (track and field) at the 2008 Summer Paralympics
Athletes (track and field) at the 2012 Summer Paralympics
Paralympic silver medalists for Greece
Paralympic bronze medalists for Greece
Greek female sprinters
Living people
1981 births
Medalists at the 2008 Summer Paralympics
Medalists at the 2012 Summer Paralympics
Paralympic medalists in athletics (track and field)
Visually impaired sprinters
Paralympic sprinters
Sportspeople from Kavala
21st-century Greek people
Greek blind people